Rough Magic is a 1995 comedy film directed by Clare Peploe, starring Bridget Fonda and Russell Crowe. The screenplay was written by Robert Mundi, William Brookfield, and Clare Peploe. Rough Magic is based on the 1944 novel Miss Shumway Waves a Wand by British novelist James Hadley Chase; that novel had previously been adapted as the 1962 French-Argentine film Une blonde comme ça.

Cast
 Bridget Fonda as Myra Shumway
 Russell Crowe as Alex Ross
 Jim Broadbent as Doc Ansell
 Kenneth Mars as Magician
 D. W. Moffett as Cliff Wyatt
 Paul Rodriguez as Diego

Production
Filming locations in Michoacán, Mexico; Tikal, Guatemala; and Los Angeles, United States.

Release
The film was released in France on August 30, 1995 and in the United States on May 30, 1997.

External links

1995 films
1995 comedy films
American comedy films
Films based on works by James Hadley Chase
Films based on British novels
Films set in the 1950s
Films set in Mexico
Films shot in Mexico
Films about magic
1990s English-language films
1990s American films